Jenna Olivia Legg (born 23 July 1997) is an English footballer who plays as a midfielder for Watford in the FA Women's Championship.

Club career

Legg emerged from Chelsea's Centre of Excellence to join the first team for the 2016 FA WSL season. In July 2016 Chelsea sent Legg and teammate Laura Rafferty on loan to Oxford United. Legg and Rafferty both signed for Brighton & Hove Albion ahead of the FA WSL Spring Series.

In March 2019, Legg left Brighton by mutual consent and was praised by the team's coach Hope Powell: "Jenna leaves the club having played a huge part in our recent success, and her contribution will not be forgotten."

On 22 August 2019, Legg signed with FA Women's Championship team Charlton Athletic.

International career

Legg played for the England women's national under-19 football team at the 2015 UEFA Women's Under-19 Championship in Israel.

References

External links

1997 births
Women's association football midfielders
Brighton & Hove Albion W.F.C. players
Women's Super League players
English women's footballers
Chelsea F.C. Women players
Living people
Sportspeople from Basingstoke
Oxford United W.F.C. players
Charlton Athletic W.F.C. players
Footballers from Hampshire
Watford F.C. Women players